Seeley may refer to:


People and fictional characters
 Seeley (surname)
 Seeley Booth, a fictional character in the American television series Bones
 Seeley G. Mudd (1895-1968), American physician, professor and philanthropist
 Seeley W. Mudd (1861–1926), mining engineer

Places
United States
 Seeley, California, a census-designated place
 Camp Seeley, a US Army World War II training camp near El Centro, California
 Seeley, New Jersey, a census-designated place
 Seeley, Wisconsin, an unincorporated community
 Seeley Lake, Montana, a lake and community
 Seeley Cottage, Harrietstown, New York
 Seeley Farmhouse, Glenville, New York
 Samuel W. Seeley House, Bridgeton, New Jersey
 William Stuart Seeley House, Mount Pleasant, Utah

Canada
 a lake in Seeley Lake Provincial Park, British Columbia

Other uses
 Seeley Historical Library, the history library of the University of Cambridge, England
 Seeley, Service, British publishing firm (1744-1979)

See also
 Sealey
 Sealy (disambiguation)
 Seely